Admington is a village and civil parish in the Stratford-on-Avon district of the English county of Warwickshire. The name Admington means "estate associated with a man called Æthelhelm"  and the village is referred to in the Domesday Book as Edelmintone. Until 31 March 1931 the parish was a part of Gloucestershire. Admington shares a village hall with the neighbouring village of Quinton. In the 2001 census the parish had a population of 100. The 2011 census gives population details combined with those of Quinton. Admington is the location of Admington Hall, an early 17th-century country house with an 18th-century façade.

References

External links

 About Britain - Admington
 Admington UK
 Windows on Warwickshire - Admington Hall
 Wikimapia - Admington
 Quinton & Admington Village Hall

Villages in Warwickshire
Civil parishes in Warwickshire